The Siesta may refer to:
The Siesta (Van Gogh), painting by Vincent van Gogh
The Siesta (Paul Gauguin), painting by Paul Gauguin

See also
Siesta